Alice Rooney may refer to:

Alice Ann Rooney, actress
Alice Owen Rooney, character in About Adam